Tirutturaiyur Sishtagurunatheswarar Temple
(திருத்துறையூர் சிஷ்டகுருநாதர்சுவாமி கோயில்
)is a Hindu temple located at Tiruthalur in Cuddalore district, Tamil Nadu, India. The presiding deity is Shiva. He is called as Sishtagurunatheswarar. His consort is known as Thyagavalliammai.

Significance 
It is one of the shrines of the 275 Paadal Petra Sthalams – Shiva Sthalams glorified in the early medieval Tevaram poems by Tamil Saivite Nayanar Appar.

References 

Shiva temples in Cuddalore district
Padal Petra Stalam